For people of the same name see Rhys Williams (disambiguation)

Rhys Williams (born 16 January 1990) is a Welsh rugby union player. A hooker, he plays club rugby for Cardiff Blues regional team having previously played for Pontypridd RFC.

References

External links
 Cardiff Blues profile

Welsh rugby union players
Cardiff Rugby players
1990 births
Living people
Rugby union players from Pontypridd
Rugby union hookers